The 2004 Men's Pan American Cup was the second edition of the Men's Pan American Cup, the quadrennial men's international field hockey championship of the Americas organized by the Pan American Hockey Federation. It was held between 12 and 23 May 2004 in London, Ontario, Canada. The tournament doubled as the qualifier to the 2006 World Cup to be held in Mönchengladbach, Germany. The winner would qualify directly while the runner-up would have the chance to obtain one of five berths at the World Cup Qualifier in Changzhou, China.

Argentina won the tournament for the first time after defeating Canada 2–1 in the final, earning an automatic berth at the 2006 World Cup.

Teams

 (withdrew)

Umpires
Below are the 13 umpires appointed by the Pan American Hockey Federation:

Gianluca Caredda (BRA)
Roberto Curti (ITA)
John Hrytsak (CAN)
Anthony Kelleher (ENG)
Jason King (BAR)
Daniel López (URU)
Andrew Mair (SCO)
Albert Marcano (TRI)
Javier Palomo (MEX)
Daniel Santi (ARG)
Steve Simpson (USA)
Gus Soteriades (USA)
Chris Wilson (CAN)

Results
All times are Eastern Daylight Time (UTC−04:00)

First round

Pool A

Pool B

Ninth to eleventh place classification

7–9th place semi-final

Ninth place game

Fifth to eighth place classification

5–8th place semi-finals

Seventh place game

Fifth place game

First to fourth place classification

Semi-finals

Third place game

Final

Statistics

Final standings

Awards

Goalscorers

See also
2004 Women's Pan American Cup

References

External links
Official website

Men's Pan American Cup
Pan American Cup
Pan American Cup
International field hockey competitions hosted by Canada
Pan American Cup
Sports competitions in London, Ontario
Pan American Cup
Pan American Cup